Palaemon khori is a species of shrimp of the family Palaemonidae. It is native to the mangrove swamps of Qatar.

References

Palaemonidae